The 2005–06 Liechtenstein Cup was the sixty-first season of Liechtenstein's annual cup competition. Seven clubs competed with a total of sixteen teams for one spot in the first qualifying round of the UEFA Cup. Defending champions were FC Vaduz, who have won the cup continuously since 1998.

First round

|colspan="3" style="background-color:#99CCCC; text-align:center;"|13 September 2005

|-
|colspan="3" style="background-color:#99CCCC; text-align:center;"|14 September 2005

|}

Quarterfinals

|colspan="3" style="background-color:#99CCCC; text-align:center;"|18 October 2005

|-
|colspan="3" style="background-color:#99CCCC; text-align:center;"|19 October 2005

|}

Semifinals

|colspan="3" style="background-color:#99CCCC; text-align:center;"|8 November 2005

|-
|colspan="3" style="background-color:#99CCCC; text-align:center;"|9 November 2005

|}

Final

External links
Official site of the LFV
RSSSF

2005-06
2005–06 in Liechtenstein football
2005–06 domestic association football cups